Edvin Hagberg (July 31, 1875 – September 1, 1947) was a Swedish sailor who competed in the 1908 Summer Olympics and in the 1912 Summer Olympics. In 1908 he was a crew member of the Swedish boat Saga which finished fifth in the 8 metre class competition. Four years later he was part of the Swedish boat Sass which finished fourth in the 6 metre class competition.

References

1875 births
1947 deaths
Swedish male sailors (sport)
Olympic sailors of Sweden
Sailors at the 1908 Summer Olympics – 8 Metre
Sailors at the 1912 Summer Olympics – 6 Metre
20th-century Swedish people